Alza Corporation was a pharmaceutical and medical systems company.

Background
Founded in 1968 by Dr. Alejandro Zaffaroni; the company's name is a portmanteau of his name. Alza was a major pioneer in the field of drug delivery systems, bringing over 20 prescription pharmaceutical products to market, and employing about 10,000 people during 20 years. In 2001, Alza was acquired by Johnson & Johnson via a stock-for-stock transaction worth US$10.5 billion.

Drug delivery platforms 
The company owns the patents on the following delivery platforms:
 Alzamer Depot
 D-Trans
 DUROS implant
 E-Trans electrotransport
 OROS (Osmotic Release Oral System)
 Macroflux transdermal system
 Stealth liposomal

Marketed Alza products

Locations 
Alza built its first corporate headquarters in 1971, at 950 Page Mill Road in Palo Alto, California, now occupied by law firm Wilson Sonsini Goodrich & Rosati. In 1999, Alza moved its headquarters to Shoreline Business Park, where it remained until July 2007 when Alza was acquired by Johnson & Johnson and the space was vacated. The remaining employees were relocated to two buildings elsewhere in the Shoreline Business Park. Alza is now in operation in Vacaville, California, but this facility will be closed by 2022.

Alza operated a large-scale manufacturing facility in Vacaville, California, and previously operated a large-scale facility in Cashel, Ireland.

Google's Googleplex is located just east of Alza Plaza.  In August–September 2008, Google moved into the Alza plaza buildings.

See also
 Martin Gerstel
 Peter F. Carpenter

References

Johnson & Johnson subsidiaries
Defunct pharmaceutical companies of the United States
Technology companies based in the San Francisco Bay Area
Healthcare in the San Francisco Bay Area
Companies based in Mountain View, California
Pharmaceutical companies established in 1968
Pharmaceutical companies disestablished in 2001
Life sciences industry
1968 establishments in California
2001 disestablishments in California